Friedrich Frisius (17 January 1895 – 30 August 1970) was a German naval commander of World War II.

Life
Born in 1895 in Bad Salzuflen, son of the Lutheran pastor Karl Friedrich Wilhelm Frisius and his wife Karoline Luise Antoinette, Frisius entered the German Navy as a cadet in 1913 and was trained on the protected cruiser Victoria Louise just before the outbreak of the First World War. During the war he put in service on torpedo boats and cruisers and was promoted to Lieutenant, and in the inter-war period he commanded a torpedo boat as well as an assignment from 1919 to 1923 on the Baltic coastal defences, maintaining law and order in Germany itself and putting down Communist uprisings. He also joined the Abwehr's Foreign Department at the Reich Defence Ministry from 1929 to 1931 and from 1935 onwards (with a break to command two ships and for a role at the Naval Academy Mürwik).

By 1939 he was a staff-officer of the Hamburg Kriegsmarine Service Centre (one of the other Kriegsmarinedienststellen, which were responsible for troop movements and the use of merchant shipping for the war office), and later moved to the Boulogne Service Centre. He remained in the area as commander of the Boulogne's coastal defences, from 26 January 1941 onwards. From 16 December 1941 to 28 October 1944, he took over command of the defences of the whole Pas de Calais, though these were non-existent by 15 September 1944, when he was moved to command the Fortress of Dunkirk (Festung Duenkirchen). He was in command of German forces there throughout its long siege in 1944-45 (being promoted to Vizeadmiral (vice admiral) on 30 September 1944), and signed its unconditional surrender at the end of the war. He was held as a POW at Island Farm, the Special Camp 11 at Bridgend, from then until his release on 6 October 1947.

He died in Lingen in 1970.

Frisius is best remembered for his tenacious and effective defense of Dunkirk.  Against a background of accelerating strategic collapse by the Germans, he maintained a level of morale and effectiveness in his troops resembling that of the much more capable pre-1943 Wehrmacht.  The last German offensive operation in France was Frisius's counterattack against the encircling Allied troops on the dawn of the 5 April 1945; while ultimately unsuccessful, it was strong enough to cause the Allies significant difficulties at the time.  Dunkirk held out until 4 May 1945, just days before the general German surrender, and did not formally capitulate until the 9th.

 
Handbill from Allied aircraft thrown over the positions of German troops in Dunkirk in the month of April or in the very first days of May 1945. Pdf-file in two pages, original recto/verso :

Awards and decorations 
 Iron Cross (1914) 2nd and 1st Class
 Clasp to the Iron Cross (1939) 2nd and 1st Class
 German Cross in Gold (16 September 1944)
 Marineartillerie-Kriegsabz (30 September 1944) Festung Duenkirchen

References
Citations

Bibliography

External links
Short biography
VHU Praha : handbill also archived in Prague. Document "WARNUNG ! An die deutschen Truppen in Dünkirchen ! ..."

 Operation Blücher: the Last German Attack in France, April 1945

1895 births
1970 deaths
People from Bad Salzuflen
People from the Principality of Lippe
Vice admirals of the Kriegsmarine
German prisoners of war in World War II held by the United Kingdom
Recipients of the clasp to the Iron Cross, 1st class
Recipients of the Gold German Cross
Imperial German Navy personnel of World War I
Reichsmarine personnel
20th-century Freikorps personnel